This is a partial list of secondary state highways in the U.S. state of Virginia. The numbers begin with 600 and can go into five digits in populous counties such as Fairfax County. The same number can be, and usually is, assigned to secondary roads in multiple counties. Because of the sheer number of secondary routes, this list is not intended to be a complete list.

For information about the creation and history of Virginia's Secondary Roads System, see article Byrd Road Act.

Secondary highways

SR 600 to SR 699

SR 700 to SR 799

Additional routes

SR 703 (Northampton County)

State Route 703 in Northampton County is a secondary state highway. Also known as Butler's Bluff Drive, it begins at Kiptopeke Drive and loops around to Arlington Road.

SR 704 (Northampton County)
State Route 704 in Northampton County is a secondary state highway. Also known as Kiptopeke Drive, it begins at the Lankford Highway in Kiptopeke and continues into Kiptopeke State Park.

SR 711 (Chesterfield and Powhatan Counties)

State Route 711 in Chesterfield and Powhatan Counties is a secondary state highway which runs from State Route 147 west to U.S. Route 522. It was primary State Route 44 until 1952.

SR 712 (Brunswick County)

State Route 712 in Brunswick County is an old alignment of the present US 1 corridor, bypassed in 1925. It runs  from State Route 606, just south of U.S. Route 58 at Edgerton, north to US 1 at the Nottoway River.
Until 1949, it was primary State Route 140.

SR 738 (Caroline, Hanover, and Spotsylvania Counties)
State Route 738 in Caroline, Hanover and Spotsylvania Counties, Virginia is a  secondary state highway between Richmond and Fredericksburg. It begins at State Route 646 northwest of Hanover, heading north and west to cross U.S. Route 1 at Gum Tree. From there it heads gradually west and north, mostly along an old alignment of State Route 1 (now US 1), through Coatesville, Chilesburg, and Partlow. SR 738 ends at an intersection with State Route 208 and State Route 606 at Snell; SR 208 continues northeasterly via Spotsylvania to US 1 south of Fredericksburg.

SR 744 (Lee County)

Its continuation in Tennessee is an unnumbered county road in the direction of Alanthus Hill and State Route 63. SR 744 was primary SR 62 until 1942.

SR 758 (Lee County)

Its continuation in Tennessee is an unnumbered county road in the direction of State Route 63 at Mulberry Gap. SR 758 was primary SR 63 until 1946.

SR 762 (Smyth and Washington Counties)

State Route 762 in Smyth and Washington Counties runs  from State Route 91 at Lodi east to State Route 600 and State Route 660 at St. Clair Bottom and then north to Interstate 81 and State Route 107 in Chilhowie. Except for a realignment at St. Clair Bottom, SR 762 was primary State Route 79 until 1953. (The part west of St. Clair Bottom had been a primary state highway since 1924.)

SR 803 (Accomack County)
State Route 803 in Accomack County, also known as Causeway Road and Wallops Island Road, is a road that connects SR 679 (Atlantic Road) in Assawoman to the Wallops Island Flight Facility on Wallops Island.

SR 805 (Grayson County)

SR 805 was primary State Route 95 until 1953.

SR 5000 (James City County)
State Route 5000 in James City County is a secondary state highway.

See also

References

Secondary